Mass'oud Mirza Zell-e Soltan ("Mass'oud Mirza the Sultan's Shadow"; 5 January 1850 in Tabriz – 2 July 1918 in Isfahan), or Massud Mirza, was a Persian prince of the Qajar dynasty; he was known as the "Yamin-al-Dowleh" ("Right Hand of the Government"). He was posted as the governor of Isfahan for over 35 years, and the governor of Mazandaran, Fars, and Isfahan for a total of 40 years.

Early life
He was the eldest son of Nasser-al-Din Shah and Effat-od-Dowleh, and the brother of Kamran Mirza Nayeb es-Saltaneh and of Mozzafar-al-Din Mirza (who eventually became Mozzafar-al-Din Shah), but Mas'oud Mirza could not ascend the throne because his mother not from the Qajar dynasty's family group. At the age of thirteen he was appointed the governor of Mazandaran, Turkman Sahra, Semnan, and Damghan for four years.

Later life
He was governor of Esfahan from 1872 to 1907 and governor of Fars from 1907 to 1908. Mass'oud Mirza died in Esfahan in 1918. He was buried in Mashhad. He had 14 sons and 11 daughters.

Issue
Zell-e Soltan had 14 sons and 11 daughters including :
 Prince Homayoun Mirza Mass’oud Amir Arfae
 Prince Soltan Hossein Mirza Jalal ed-Dowleh
 Prince Pirouz Mirza Mass'oud
 Prince Bahram Mirza Sardar Mass'oud (1885 – 24 March 1916)
 Prince Akbar Mirza Sarem ed-Dowleh (1885 – 29 September 1975)
 Prince Esma'il Mirza Mo'tamed Dowleh (1887–1968)

Honours
 2nd class of Order of the Lion and the Sun of Persia
 1st class of Order of the Lion and the Sun of Persia
 2nd class of Neshan-e Aqdas of Persia
 Knight of the Order of the Star of India
 Knight of the Order of the Black Eagle of Prussia
 Knight of the Order of the Red Eagle of Prussia
 Knight of the Order of the White Eagle of Russia
 Grand Cross of the Legion d'Honneur of France
 Exalted Order of Honour of Turkey

References

Bibliography
 Soltani, Shahla (2006). Aqajan Shazdeh. Tehran: Farzan Rooz.

External links
 Genealogy of descendants of Mass'oud Mirza Zell-e Soltan,  qajarpages
 A carpet made for Zell-e Soltan 

Qajar princes
1850 births
1918 deaths
People of the Persian Constitutional Revolution
Recipients of the Order of the White Eagle (Russia)
Grand Croix of the Légion d'honneur
Honorary Knights Commander of the Order of the Star of India
Politicians from Tabriz
19th-century Iranian politicians
Qajar governors of Isfahan
20th-century Iranian politicians
Burials at Imam Reza Shrine